Juay is a corregimiento in San Félix District, Chiriquí Province, Panama. Its population as of 1990 was 697; its population as of 2000 was 557.

References

Corregimientos of Chiriquí Province